Dennis Martin (born 27 October 1947) is a Scottish former footballer who played in the Football League for Carlisle United, Mansfield Town, Newcastle United and West Bromwich Albion.

References

Scottish footballers
English Football League players
1947 births
Living people
Kettering Town F.C. players
West Bromwich Albion F.C. players
Carlisle United F.C. players
Newcastle United F.C. players
Mansfield Town F.C. players
Association football wingers